Polyommatus annamaria is a butterfly in the family Lycaenidae. It was described by Zsolt Bálint in 1992. It is found in the north-western Pamir Mountains.

References

Butterflies described in 1992
Polyommatus
Butterflies of Asia